Building Nothing Out of Something is a compilation album released in January 2000 by American indie rock band Modest Mouse, comprising non-album tracks from various points in the band's career. Most of the tracks are A- and B-sides from 7" singles,  but it also includes three tracks from the Interstate 8 EP, and "Baby Blue Sedan" from the vinyl version of The Lonesome Crowded West.  All songs were originally released from 1996 to 1998. In 2015, Brock's Glacial Pace re-released the album for CD and Vinyl (with some unmarked random copies containing red vinyl rather than black).

Track listing
All songs written by Modest Mouse.

"Never Ending Math Equation" – 3:23
 A-side of the 1998 single "Never Ending Math Equation"
"Interstate 8" – 4:39
 Taken from the "Interstate 8 EP"
"Broke" – 3:19
 A-side of the 1996 single "Broke"
"Medication" – 5:01
 B-side of the 1996 single "A Life of Arctic Sounds"
"Workin' on Leavin' the Livin'" – 6:40
 B-side of the 1998 single "Never Ending Math Equation"
"All Night Diner" (also entitled "All Nite Diner") – 4:44
 Taken from the "Interstate 8 EP"
"Baby Blue Sedan" – 4:04
 Bonus track on the LP version of "The Lonesome Crowded West"
"A Life of Arctic Sounds" – 2:29
 A-side of the 1996 single "A Life of Arctic Sounds"
"Sleepwalking" (also entitled "Sleepwalkin'," and "Sleepwalking (Couples Only Dance Prom Night)") – 3:23
 Melody taken from "Sleep Walk" by Santo and Johnny
 Taken from the "Interstate 8 EP"
"Grey Ice Water" – 5:05
 B-side of the 1998 single "Other People's Lives"
"Whenever You Breathe Out, I Breathe In (Positive Negative)" (also simply called "Positive Negative") – 5:18
 B-side of the 1996 single "Broke"
"Other People's Lives" – 7:10
 A-side of the 1998 single "Other People's Lives"

Vinyl edition

Personnel

 Isaac Brock – Guitar, Vocals
 Eric Judy – Bass
 Jeremiah Green – Drums

With:
 Nicole Johnson – Vocals on Tracks 2, 9, & 10
 Steve Wold – Organ, Engineer, Slide Guitar on Track 4
 Dann Gallucci – Guitar on Track 8
 Joey Bullock – Drawing
 Barry Corliss – Mastering
 Brian Deck – Drawing
 Phil Ek – Engineer
 Calvin Johnson – Producer, Engineer

References

Modest Mouse albums
B-side compilation albums
2000 compilation albums